Ivo Mršnik  (29 June 1939) is a Slovenian painter, graphic artist, draughtsman and professor.

Mršnik was born in Knežak, Ilirska Bistrica, in 1939. He studied at the Ljubljana Academy of Fine Arts and has received numerous awards for his works.

Biography
In 1968 he graduated from the painting department of the Academy of Fine Arts in Ljubljana, Slovenia. Since 1978 he has been working at the Faculty of Education in Ljubljana, since 1998 as a full-time professor of drawing and graphics with methodology.

Already in the 70s, Ivo Mršnik created an interesting work conceptually based on almost photorealistic drawings. Later, through a series of large portraits, his drawing was reduced to a specific minimalism that is recognizable and current in the Slovenian art scene.

Ivo Mršnik is one of the most important Slovenian painters and graphic artists. He has created numerous artistic works, especially in graphics, a work which has its persuasive significance not only in Slovenia but also abroad. His graphic sheets are part of important collections such as:[[Albertina, Museum Collection, Vienna, Austria, National Fund for Contemporary Art (FNAC), Paris.

The sophisticated and intimate style reveals immense emotional and intellectual subtlety.

Exhibitions
He has held numerous solo exhibitions, many in important galleries in Ljubljana, Kranj, Gorizia, Škofja Loka, and Koper (Capo d'Istria).

He has participated in more than one hundred group exhibitions in many world art centers.

Awards
1969 - Prešeren Award for painting (for students)
1986 - Golden Diploma, 5th Yugoslav Drawings Exhibition, Tuzla Bosnia and Herzegovina
1986 - ransom prize, 5th Yugoslav Drawings Exhibition, Tuzla (Bosnia and Herzegovina)
1992 - Second Biennial of Slovenian Graphics, Novo Mesto prize for graphics, Novo Mesto 
1992 - Selection of graphic works for Albertina, Museum Collection,Vienna, Austria
1992 - Selection of graphic works for the Fonds National d'Art Contemporain (FNAC), Paris
1993 - 1st prize for graphics Ostblock – Westbrick, Graz Austria
1993 - redemption prize, miniature graphic works, Maribor
2013 - ZDSLU (Association of Slovenian Artists). Lifetime Achievement Award
2017 - 1st prize at the 7th Mixed Media Exhibition, Lesedra, Bulgaria
2018 -  Lifetime Achievement Award Ivana Kobilca
2021 - Special Award for Contribution to World Graphic Art - 10th International Triennial Of Graphic Art Bitola- IGT Bitola, North Macedonia

Bibliography 
 Ivo Mršnik, risbe in grafike; [Mednarodni grafični likovni center, Ljubljana, 2010], ISBN 9616229311, 9789616229319
 32è Mini Print Internacional de Cadaqués 2012; 32è Mini Print Internacional de Cadaqués 2012, 2013. [na spletu], Katalog 
  Nazaj v prihodnost: eseji o slikarstvu , by Tomaž Gorjup, Ivo Mršnik, Unknown, 206 Pages, Published 2015, ISBN 9789612531744
  Likovno izražanje: učbenik za 6. razred osnovne šole , by Tonka Tacol, Črtomir Frelih, Jožef Muhovič, Domen Zupančič, Ivo Mršnik, Oto Vogrin, Črtomir Mihelj Unknown, 116 Pages, Published 2013, ISBN 961-6525-78-6  / 9616525786

References

External links
 https://core.ac.uk/download/pdf/35123777.pdf - Prisotna otsotnost figure
 Akademski slikar in grafik Ivo Mršnik, intervju,  https://www.mojaobcina.si/log-dragomer/novice/akademski-slikar-in-grafik-ivo-mrsnik.html
 Lesedra gallery - http://www.artis.si/IvoMrsnikLessedraGallery/1.pdf
 RAZSTAVA IVO MRŠNIK. NEKAJ SKIC IZ KOTOV IN S POLIC, https://www.kocevje.si/objava/577773
 SICRIS -https://cris.cobiss.net/ecris/si/sl/biblio?q=as%3D(16080)%20and%20ucpex%3D(92900)
 Naš gost: Ivo Mršnik - https://radio.ognjisce.si/sl/236/oddaje/33001/nas-gost-ivo-mrsnik.htm

Slovenian painters
Slovenian male painters
Slovenian academics
1939 births
Living people